Terminus Le Carrefour is an Exo bus terminus across boulevard Le Carrefour from the Carrefour Laval at the corner of Terry Fox Avenue. It is one block west of Autoroute 15. A Radisson Hotel is located between Terry Fox Avenue and the Autoroute, and a Hilton Hotel and a Sheraton Hotel are nearby.

South of the terminus are 226 park and ride spaces.

Connecting bus routes

See also 
 ARTM park and ride lots

References

External links

 2009 STL System Map 
 STL 2011 map 
 STL Schedules

 AMT Termini
 Sheraton Laval Hotel
 Interactive STL map

Exo bus stations
Transport in Laval, Quebec
Buildings and structures in Laval, Quebec